Marion Jessie Mainwaring (April 21, 1922 – December 12, 2015) was an American writer, translator, and critic.

Mainwaring is best known as the author who completed Edith Wharton's novel The Buccaneers, published in 1993. She earlier assisted R. W. B. Lewis in researching his Pulitzer- and Bancroft-prize-winning 1976 biography of Wharton.

She wrote the novels Murder in Pastiche: or Nine Detectives All at Sea (1954), parodying nine famous fictional detectives, and Murder at Midyears (1953), based on her experiences in teaching at Mount Holyoke College. She translated Youth and Age: Three Novellas by Ivan Turgenev and edited The Portrait Game, records of a parlor game played by Turgenev and his friends. Her last major work was Mysteries of Paris: The Quest for Morton Fullerton (2001), a biography of Wharton's lover.

References

External links

 

1922 births
2015 deaths
Writers from Boston
American women writers
Russian–English translators
20th-century American translators
20th-century American women
21st-century American women